Záblatí may refer to places in the Czech Republic:

Záblatí (Jindřichův Hradec District), a municipality and village in the South Bohemian Region
Záblatí (Prachatice District), a municipality and village in the South Bohemian Region
Záblatí (Žďár nad Sázavou District), a municipality and village in the Vysočina Region
Záblatí (Bohumín), a village and part of Bohumín in the Moravian-Silesian Region
Záblatí, a village and part of Dříteň in the South Bohemian Region